"Reckoning Song" is a song written by Israeli singer-songwriter Asaf Avidan and performed by Asaf Avidan and the Mojos. The original under this title is track number 5 on the band's 2008 album The Reckoning.

A remixed version of the song credited as "One Day / Reckoning Song (Wankelmut Rmx)" produced by German DJ Wankelmut became a huge commercial success in many European charts, including number one positions in Austria, Belgium, Hungary, Netherlands, Switzerland, Italy and Germany. It also charted in Poland, France, Denmark, Sweden, Latvia, Luxembourg and Romania. The song is released on the Four Music label and distributed throughout Europe by Sony. The Wankelmut Remix is the version that received radio play in the UK and was described as "having all the hallmarks of classical minimal techno". The single is Asaf Avidan's follow-up to "Different Pulses" from his 2012 solo album of the same name. The song was featured in a Hyundai commercial in 2016.

Music video
A music video was prepared for the single release on 22 June 2012. The video was directed by Daniel Franke and Sander Houtkruijer and stars performance artists Voin de Voin, Stephanie Ballantine and Blagoy Veogalb.
From the same directors and performers there was a second version where the script occurs in day light. This second version has been removed from YouTube and all video media without notice.

Cover versions
In November 2013 a version of the track inspired by the Wankelmut remix was sung by young Italian singer Violetta Zironi during season 7 of the Italian version of The X Factor. The track was also recorded and included in her debut EP "Dimmi che non passa" released in December 2013.

Track listing

Digital promo – Four Music / Columbia
"One Day / Reckoning Song (Wankelmut Rmx)" – 3:30
Digital download (Beatport) – Fine Records
"One Day / Reckoning Song (Wankelmut Rmx)" – 7:16
CD single – Four Music
"One Day / Reckoning Song (Wankelmut Rmx)" (radio edit) – 3:30
"One Day / Reckoning Song (Wankelmut Rmx)" (club mix) – 7:16
CD maxi – Four Music
"One Day / Reckoning Song (Wankelmut Rmx)" (radio edit) – 3:33
"One Day / Reckoning Song (Wankelmut Rmx)" (club mix) – 7:18
"One Day / Reckoning Song (Wankelmut Rmx)" (Wankelmut in dub mix) – 4:53
"Reckoning Song" – 2:49
"One Day / Reckoning Song (Wankelmut Rmx)" (instrumental) – 4:53
"One Day / Reckoning Song (Wankelmut Rmx)" (day version) (video) – 3:30
"One Day / Reckoning Song (Wankelmut Rmx)" (night version) (video) – 3:30

Chart positions

Weekly charts

Year-end charts

Certifications

Release history

See also
List of Dutch Top 40 number-one singles of 2012
List of number-one hits of 2012 (Italy)

References

2012 singles
Dutch Top 40 number-one singles
Number-one singles in Austria
Number-one singles in Germany
Number-one singles in Italy
Number-one singles in Poland
Number-one singles in Switzerland
Ultratop 50 Singles (Wallonia) number-one singles
Ultratop 50 Singles (Flanders) number-one singles
2012 songs